The Skuldelev ships are five original Viking ships recovered from the waterway of Peberrenden at Skuldelev,  north of Roskilde in Denmark. In 1962, the remains of the submerged ships were excavated in the course of four months. The recovered pieces constitute five types of Viking ships and have all been dated to the 11th century. They are thought to have been an early form of blockship, i.e. ships that were scuttled to block potential invasions from the sea. When the remains were unearthed, they were thought to comprise six ships, but "Skuldelev 2" and "Skuldelev 4" were later discovered to be parts of one ship.

Together, the five Skuldelev ships provide a good source of information about the shipbuilding traditions of the late Viking Age and are now exhibited at the Viking Ship Museum in Roskilde. The museum has built accurate reconstructions of all five of the original Skuldelev ships; some of them have also been reconstructed by other groups across the world.

Skuldelev 1

Skuldelev 1 was a sturdy seagoing cargo-vessel, possibly of the knarr type. It is 16 m long and 4.8 m wide and would have had a draught of 1 m with its crew of 6 to 8. The ship was constructed in Sognefjorden in western Norway around 1030 A. D. from thick planks of pine, but has been repeatedly repaired with oak and linden wood during its lifetime, in the Oslo Fjord and in Eastern Denmark.

Skuldelev 1 has been replicated as the Viking ship Ottar by the Roskilde Viking Ship Museum and is on display in the Museum Harbour.

Skuldelev 2

Skuldelev 2 is an oak-built, seagoing warship. It is a longship, possibly of the skeid type.

It is approximately 30 m long and 3.8 m wide, and would have had a draught of just 1 m with a maximum crew of 70-80. Dendrochronology showed that the ship was built in the Dublin area around 1042. It is one of the longest Viking ships ever found, but was the least preserved of the Skuldelev ships, with only 25% of the original left.

The Roskilde Viking Ship Museum administered a €1.34 million replication project of Skuldelev 2, known as The Sea Stallion from Glendalough (in Danish: Havhingsten). The project ran from August 2000 to September 2004 and comprised a total of almost 40,000 hours of labour. In the summer of 2007, Sea Stallion sailed from Roskilde to Dublin, arriving on 14 August. The ship was on exhibit in Dublin until the summer of 2008, at which time it sailed back to Roskilde, arriving on 9 August.

Skuldelev 3

The Skuldelev 3 is a 14 m long and 3.3 m wide cargo ship, possibly of the byrding type. It is made from oak, with a cargo capacity of 4-5 tons and a draught of just 0.9 m. It was constructed around 1040, somewhere in Denmark. With a crew of 5-8 and a 45 m2 sail as its primary power, Skuldelev 3 would have been well-suited for shorter journeys in Danish waters and the Baltic Sea. 

It could reach a top-speed of c. . Skuldelev 3 is the best preserved of the Skuldelev ships, with 75% of the original remaining.

Roskilde Viking Ship Museum has replicated Skuldelev 3 as the Viking ship replica Roar Ege.

Skuldelev 5

Skuldelev 5 is a small warship of the snekkja type.

It is 17.3 m long and 2.5 m wide and would have had a draught of 0.6 m with a crew of about 30. It is made from a mixture of wood types with oak, pine, ash and alder, and was built around 1030 in the Roskilde area. The ship was purpose-built for sailing in the shallow Danish waters and the Baltic Sea. The top planks are equipped with holes for shield straps.

Roskilde Viking Ship Museum has replicated Skuldelev 5 as the replica Helge Ask. This is not the only replica of Skuldelev 5 however, the first being Sebbe Als, built in 1969 in Augustenborg, also in Denmark.

Skuldelev 6

Skuldelev 6 is an 11.2 m long and 2.5 m wide vessel of unknown purpose, equipped with oars and a sail. 

It had a good cargo capacity, with a draught of 0.5 m and was probably built for fishing. Like Skuldelev 1, Skuldelev 6 was built in Sognefjorden in western Norway around 1030, mainly from pine. It would have had a crew of 5-15. During its lifetime the ship was rebuilt somewhat, probably to be deployed as a coastal cargo ship. In this state it would have been known as a Ferje, a general term for smaller cargo vessels. 70% of the original ship has survived.

Skuldelev 6 has been replicated as Kraka Fyr in 1998 by the Roskilde Viking Ship Museum. In 2010, the museum replicated the original ship again as Skjoldungen. While also staying true to the original remains, Skjoldungen has a different interpretation of the bow and stern design.

Notes

References

External links

 The Viking Ship Museum in Roskilde

Ships preserved in museums
Viking ships
Archaeological sites in Denmark
Danish Culture Canon
11th-century ships